Microlestodes is a genus of beetles in the family Carabidae, containing the following species:

 Microlestodes atrifasciatus (Sloane, 1910) 
 Microlestodes australiensis (Sloane, 1899) 
 Microlestodes cinctus (Darlington, 1968) 
 Microlestodes flavicornis Baehr, 1987 
 Microlestodes inoculatus Baehr, 1987 
 Microlestodes macleayi (Csiki, 1932) 
 Microlestodes marcidus (Blackburn, 1903) 
 Microlestodes occidentalis Baehr, 1990 
 Microlestodes ovatus Baehr, 1987 
 Microlestodes parallelus Baehr, 1987 
 Microlestodes pseudohumeralis Baehr, 1987 
 Microlestodes rufoniger Baehr, 1987 
 Microlestodes yarrae (Blackburn, 1892) 
 Microlestodes zonatus Baehr, 1987

References

Lebiinae